Edinburgh North was a burgh constituency of the House of Commons of the Parliament of the United Kingdom from 1918 to 1983. It elected one Member of Parliament (MP) using the first-past-the-post voting system.

Boundaries

In 1918 the constituency consisted of the "Broughton, Calton, St. Andrew's and St. Stephen's Municipal Wards of Edinburgh."

Members of Parliament

Election results

Elections in the 1910s

Elections in the 1920s

Elections in the 1930s

Elections in the 1940s
General Election 1939–40:

Another General Election was required to take place before the end of 1940. The political parties had been making preparations for an election to take place from 1939 and by the end of this year, the following candidates had been selected; 
Unionist: Alexander Erskine-Hill 
Labour: Gerald Walker Crawford

Elections in the 1950s

Elections in the 1960s

Elections in the 1970s

References

Historic parliamentary constituencies in Scotland (Westminster)
Constituencies of the Parliament of the United Kingdom established in 1918
Constituencies of the Parliament of the United Kingdom disestablished in 1983
Constituencies in Edinburgh